Neil Jenkins is a rugby union footballer, and coach.

Neil Jenkins may also refer to:
Neil Jenkins (footballer)
George Neil Jenkins, commonly known as Neil Jenkins, professor of oral physiology
Neil Jenkins, character in Gavin & Stacey